KZSJ (1120 kHz) is a commercial AM radio station licensed to San Martin, California.  It has a radio format of music and talk in Vietnamese and Korean, serving San Jose and the Santa Clara Valley. The station is currently owned by Bustos Media. Programming is produced by  Media, which used to air on a digital subchannel of KAXT-CD.

By day, KZSJ is powered at 5,000 watts non-directional.  But 1120 AM is a clear channel frequency reserved for Class A KMOX St. Louis.  So to avoid interference, KZSJ greatly reduces power at night to 150 watts.  Programming is heard around the clock on 60 watt FM translator 101.7 K269GX in San Jose.

History
Founded by Jeffrey Eustis, KZSJ had its first construction permit on January 18, 1991, with the call sign KSJI. The call letters changed to KZSJ on November 1, 1995. Later that month, KZSJ began broadcasting with a Regional Mexican music format that played genres including banda and ranchera as part of the Z-Spanish Radio Network operated by Redwood City entrepreneur Amador Bustos.

Eustis finalized a sale of KZSJ for $450,000 in late January 1996 to Bustos.  KZSJ was granted its first broadcasting license on February 21, 1996.

In March 1999, KZSJ entered a local marketing agreement (LMA) with Quê Hương Inc. and changed to a Vietnamese language format. Programming on the Quê Hương radio network has included music, community events, and legal advice geared towards Vietnamese-American communities. By 2003, Bustos moved KZSJ to his Bustos Media company.

In July 2003, KZSJ broadcast public service announcements from the San Jose Police Department in Vietnamese expressing condolences to the family of a 25-year-old woman of Vietnamese descent who was fatally shot at her home by officers who thought the woman was carrying a weapon, which turned out to be a vegetable peeler.

Beginning around 2014, KZSJ began broadcasting Korean-language programming on weekday mornings from Santa Clara-based Hanmi Radio.

On February 1, 2018, Bustos Media obtained a construction permit for an FM translator for KZSJ.  K269GX broadcasts on 101.7 MHz. The FM translator was formally licensed on April 8, 2020.

References

External links

1995 establishments in California
Radio stations established in 1995
ZSJ
ZSJ
Korean-American culture in California
Santa Clara County, California